Royal Vista is a business park in the northwest quadrant of Calgary, Alberta, Canada. It is bounded by Country Hills Boulevard to the southwest, Stoney Trail to the southeast, and 112 Avenue N.W. to the north.

See also 
List of neighbourhoods in Calgary

References 

Neighbourhoods in Calgary